Fantasy cricket is a part of the fantasy sports genre. It is an online game in which a virtual team of real cricket players is created and points are scored depending on how those players perform in real-life matches. To win a tournament, players must work towards attaining the maximum points and the highest rank on the leaderboard.

Fantasy cricket matches
A fantasy cricket match is based on batting and bowling orders, which are the most debated part of cricketing strategy. A small change in the order can change the course of the game. The concept involves selecting a team of 11 players and 3 substitutes from the pool of players who play the match. There are no budget caps and player selection is not limited to a particular number of batters, bowlers and all-rounders although in some fantasy applications you can only create team according to their prerequisite patterns. An example of their given pattern could be 5 batters, 1 wicket-keeper, 2 all-rounders, 3 bowlers. A fantasy team can have any type of players. The main aim in a fantasy cricket match is to outscore the opposition by as large of a margin as possible. Fantasy cricket matches can be played in all three international forms: One Day International, Twenty20  and Test Cricket. The limited over matches, namely the One Day Internationals and Twenty20s, are played in two formats – daily games and rounds.

By country

India
Fantasy cricket is classified as a "game of skill", similar to fantasy sports in the United States. Fantasy Cricket for Cash is at the hub of three dynamic industry spokes – Internet, gaming and cricket.

The Supreme Court of India has explained skill in terms of superior knowledge, training, attention, experience and adroitness. In K.R. Lakshmanan v. State of Tamil Nadu AIR 1996 SC 1153, it stated as follows:

"A game of skill, on the other hand – although the element of chance necessarily cannot be entirely eliminated – is one in which success depends principally upon the superior knowledge, training, attention, experience and adroitness of the player."

The relevant excerpt from the Supreme Court's judgment is:
"There are few games, if any, which consist purely of chance or skill, and as such a game of chance is one in which the element of chance predominates over the element of skill, and a game of skill is one in which the element of skill predominates over the element of chance. It is the dominant element – 'skill' or 'chance' – which determines the character of the game."

The court categorically stated the meaning of skill (in paragraph 20), in the following terms: "We, therefore, hold that the expression “mere skill” would mean substantial degree or preponderance of skill." In the case, the Court considered Section 11 of the Tamil Nadu Gaming Act, which excluded the application of the act to games of ‘mere skill’, and is in pari materia with Section 12 of the Public Gambling Act of 1867. In that case the Court concluded that horse-racing was a game of skill.

United States
In USA, cricket is enjoyed largely by Indian sub-continent diaspora. While fantasy (American) football is extremely popular, other sports including cricket lack mass appeal due to limited knowledge of the game in the country.

In USA, fantasy sports for cash is defined and exempted by the Unlawful Internet Gambling Enforcement Act of 2006. The act included a provision that the law would not apply to fantasy sports games, educational games, or any online contest that "has an outcome that reflects the relative knowledge of the participants, or their skill at physical reaction or physical manipulation (but not chance), and, in the case of a fantasy or simulation sports game, has an outcome that is determined predominantly by accumulated statistical results of sporting events, including any single score, point-spread, team performance, or individual performance in such sporting events…"

References

Fantasy sports